The Taishin International Bank Tower is a skyscraper office building in Daan District, Taipei, Taiwan. It is the corporate headquarters of Taishin Financial Holdings.

Design
The tower was completed in 2004 and was designed by Pei Cobb Freed & Partners and Haigo Shen & Associates. Inspired by the Bank of China Tower in Hong Kong, it was primarily designed by the same architectural firm. The overall shape of the building represents a water droplet as the principle design concepts. The exterior walls of the building use low-reflective light-blue glass façade, and the selection of building materials is based on environmental protection concepts.

See also 
 List of tallest buildings in Taiwan
 List of tallest buildings in Taipei
 Taishin Financial Holdings

References

2004 establishments in Taiwan
Office buildings completed in 2004
Skyscraper office buildings in Taipei
Bank headquarters in Taiwan